Kevin Brown (born September 3, 1960) is an American biographer, essayist, translator, and author. Born in Kansas City, Missouri, Brown spent his early  childhood in Western Europe and North Africa. By the late 1960s, Brown continued his education in the US and completed high school in 1977, after which he started to develop an interest in writing. Brown pursued his studies at Columbia University and City University of New York, as well as writing literature reviews and essays for Threepenny Review.

Moving forward, Brown wrote, contributed, or anthologized in Afterimage, American Book Review, American Visions, Apuntes, Asymptote, The Best American Essays 2021, The Brooklyn Rail, The Chattahoochee Review, The Delaware Review of Latin American Studies, eXchanges, Fiction International, Georgia Review, Hayden's Ferry Review, The Kansas City Star, Kirkus Reviews, Mayday, Metamorphoses, The Nation, New York Newsday, The Oakland Tribune, Rain Taxi, Salmagundi, The Threepenny Review, The Times Literary Supplement, Two Lines, Washington Post, etc.

Furthermore, Brown has authored biographies for Romare Bearden (Romare Bearden: Artist) in 1994, and Malcolm X (Malcolm X: His Life and Legacy) in 1995. As well as a contributing editor to the African American Desk Reference in 1999.

Early Life 
Kevin Brown was born in Kansas City, Missouri in 1960, from mother, Duan Nimmons, whose family had been active in the Harlem Renaissance and father John Brown a writer and a football running back. Before primary school, he traveled around Western Europe and North Africa with his father. In the late 60s, Brown lived in the Haight Ashbury district of San Francisco, attending Twin Peaks Elementary School. In the early 1970s, he lived in the Bay Area peninsula, in San Mateo and Santa Clara counties, attending Ralston Middle School in Belmont, California, as well as Rancho Junior High and Samuel Ayer High School in Milpitas, California, a suburb of San Jose.  He graduated from Southeast High School in Kansas City, Missouri (1977). From 1978 to 1979, he lived in St. Louis, Missouri, reading, writing, waiting tables.

Higher education and partial career 
From 1980 to 1984, in San Francisco, Brown studied Latin and Greek with a private tutor, reading widely in the works of the ancients and the French as well as contemporary post-war writers like Gore Vidal. He began publishing book reviews on writers like Zora Neale Hurston, Samuel Pepys and Virginia Woolf in newspapers such as the Oakland Tribune. Furtermore longer essays on Carlos Saura, and James Baldwin in the Threepenny Review.

In 1985, Brown worked as an editorial assistant in the publishing industry in New York, and contributed to The Times Literary Supplement.

In 1986, Brown moved to New York, attending the Columbia University School of General Studies for one year before transferring to the City University of New York. There, he double-majored in Spanish as well as Translating & Interpreting, completing his undergraduate degree in the CUNY Baccalaureate Program for Unique and Interdisciplinary Studies, headquartered at the Graduate Center. He studied with literary translator Gregory Rabassa, among others.

From 1987 to 1989, Brown was a regular contributor to Kirkus Reviews, where he published book reviews on subjects as various as Africa, African-American writers, 20th century American poetry, Anglo-American common law, Australian-New Zealand writers, French history and literature, the Harlem Renaissance, music, photography, politics.

During the 1990s, he traveled in Central America and Eastern Europe, contributed to the American Book Review, American Visions and New York Newsday, and contracted to begin work on a series of biographies on Romare Bearden, Malcolm X and Countee Cullen.

In 1994, Brown's biography of Romare Bearden, Romare Bearden: Artist, was released.

In 1995, Brown's biography of Malcolm X Malcolm X: His Life and Legacy was released. Commissioned in 1993, just after the release of Spike Lee's movie on the same subject, Brown's second book attempts to chronicle the rise and fall of Malcolm X as well as that of rival leader Martin Luther King against the backdrop of the civil rights and black nationalist movements.

In 1999, Brown was a contributing editor for the book African American Desk Reference about essential information on African American history. Brown provided chapter 14 on music.

Brown's 2005 translation into Spanish of Virginia Woolf's little known essay "Reviewing" appeared in the Iowa University journal of literary translation eXchanges.

In 2006, his profile-interview of translator Gregory Rabassa was published in 2006 by the University of Delaware's Review of Latin American Studies.

Throughout his career, Brown contributed essays and articles for  Afterimage, Apuntes, Asymptote, The Best American Essays 2021, The Brooklyn Rail, The Chattahoochee Review, The Delaware Review of Latin American Studies, eXchanges, Fiction International, Georgia Review, Hayden's Ferry Review, The Kansas City Star, Mayday, Metamorphoses, The Nation, Rain Taxi, Salmagundi, The Threepenny Review, Two Lines, Washington Post, etc.

Personal

Current Family life 
Brown lived in New York for 22 years, from 1985 to 2007, during which time he married and had a son. Brown returned to California in 2007, and currently lives in San Diego.

Family history 
Brown's career and writing were influenced by his family history. His father, John Brown, was a writer and running back with the late 1950s Iowa Hawkeyes football team who played in the 1959 Rose Bowl. In the mid-1960s, John Brown was acquainted with writers William S. Burroughs, Ted Joans, and other writers of the Beat Generation. Brown's mother, Duan Nimmons, was born (1940) in New York City, where her family had been active in the Harlem Renaissance of the 1920s and early 1930s. His maternal great-grandmother was Ida Mae Roberson (later, Ida Cullen-Cooper), widow of Harlem Renaissance poet Countee Cullen.

Partial bibliography

Biographies

Contributing editor

Selected essays, articles & reviews

 "The Soul and the Dance" (On Carlos Saura). The Threepenny Review, Vol. 18. (Summer 1984) pp. 20–22.
 "The Epistles of James". (On James Baldwin) The Threepenny Review, Vol. 19. (Autumn 1984), pp. 6-8.
 "Woolf diary, Sackville-West letters shed a new light on both women's lives" (On Virginia Woolf) Oakland Tribune, (April 10, 1984), D4
 "Images of the Spirit". (On Graciela Iturbide) Afterimage, Vol. 34.6 (May/June 2007), pp. 33–34.
 "After the Renaissance: The Life of W.E.B. Du Bois". (On W. E. B. Du Bois) The Nation, (11 December 2000), pp. 52–57.

Selected translations

 Virginia Woolf, "Reviewing" (1939). eXchanges: a Journal of Literary Translation ("Saints and Sinners" Issue, Winter 2006)
 Utah State University Digital Library, "Latino/a Voices Project":  Ana Cecilia Barragán interview July 27, 2007.
 Utah State University Digital Library, "Latino/a Voices Project": Jorge Rodas interview July 13, 2007.

As interviewer

 "Gregory Rabassa: An Interview". Delaware Review of Latin American Studies, Vol. 7 No. 2 December 30, 2006.

As interviewee

 "Blueprint for Writing: An Interview with Kevin Brown". Harlem Arts Journal, Spring 2000.

Citations 

1960 births
African-American male writers
American essayists
American male essayists
American literary critics
American music critics
American translators
American biographers
American male biographers
City University of New York alumni
Writers from California
Writers from New York (state)
Living people
Writers from Kansas City, Missouri
21st-century African-American people
20th-century African-American people

External links